Araucárias National Park is a national park in the state of Santa Catarina, Brazil.

Location

The Araucárias National Park is located in the Santa Catarina municipalities of Passos Maia and Ponte Serrada.
The park is administered by the Chico Mendes Institute for Biodiversity Conservation.
Annual rainfall averages .
The park is on the Campos Gerais, a plateau that slopes gently down to the west.

The vegetation in the area directly influenced by the park is mainly native secondary formations in different stages of regeneration, exploited primary forest, reforestation with exotic species (Pinus and Eucalyptus), agricultural areas and pastures.
The protected area is surrounded by a  buffer zone holding small farms and agrarian reform settlements as well as soy plantations and cattle ranches.
In addition to the characteristic Araucaria angustifolia of the mixed rainforest there are other endangered species such as Dicksonia sellowiana and Ocotea porosa.
The forest helps maintain water quality in the Chapecó, Chapecozinho, Mato and Caratuva rivers.

Conservation

The park is classed as IUCN protected-area category II (national park).
The basic objective is to preserve the natural environments, which hold remnants of the Araucária Forest and plants of the Atlantic Forest biome that are highly threatened by human activity.
The park supports scientific research, environmental education, outdoor recreation and eco-tourism.
The parks is threatened by wild boars, abandoned domestic animals, disturbed areas and the practice of hunting wild animals.
Protected species include maned wolf (Chrysocyon brachyurus), helmeted woodpecker (Dryocopus galeatus), ocelot (Leopardus pardalis) and cougar (Puma concolor).

Notes

Sources

National parks of Brazil
Protected areas of Santa Catarina (state)
Protected areas of the Atlantic Forest